Dr. Fred Kahn is a retired vascular surgeon and the founder, President and CEO of Meditech International Inc., which he founded in 1989.  The focus of the company has been to design and manufacture advanced Laser Therapy Systems under the brand name of BioFlex®. BioFlex® devices are widely utilized to treat both standard and complex medical conditions, many of which are resistant to conventional and traditional therapies.

Biography 
Dr. Kahn's pioneering work and leadership in Laser Therapy have resulted in inventions and treatment protocols that have continually demonstrated a high level of safety, efficacy, and cost effectiveness in the treatment of musculoskeletal problems characterized by pain. Dr. Kahn has written four textbooks along with many focused articles describing the resolution of the sequelae of trauma and an extensive number of medical disease entities. He has been elected to the Spinal Hall of Fame for his original work in resolving complex and challenging back problems, including the cervical, thoracic and lumbar spine.  He continues to conduct intensive research along with the development of new clinical applications, particularly relating to traumatic brain injuries (TBI) and other neurological impediments.

Dr. Kahn's medical career began as a graduate of the University of Toronto, Faculty of Medicine. Following six years of postgraduate studies, including a fellowship at the Lahey Clinic in Boston, Massachusetts, he spent almost 20 years practicing surgery in Santa Ana, California, where he developed an extensive surgical practice and was the driving force behind the development of a 250-bed general hospital. Initially, he served as Chief of Staff, a position he held for eight years before serving in the capacity of Chairman of the Department of Surgery.

In 1982, Dr. Kahn returned to Canada and developed a medical consulting practice for both the government and private sectors. He is a Fellow of the Royal College of Physicians and Surgeons of Canada and a Diplomate of the American Board of Surgery (DABS). Dr. Kahn has performed over 20,000 major surgical procedures.

Laser therapy 
In 1986, Dr. Kahn, an avid skier, sustained a severe shoulder injury while skiing. Traditional medical options all pointed to the necessity of surgical intervention. Dr. Kahn, however, determined surgery would add an additional trauma and inhibit the healing process. This led him to focus his interest and energy on the healing potential of Low-level laser therapy. Starting in 1988, he pioneered the development and clinical application of laser therapy systems, which continues to this day.

Dr. Kahn founded Meditech International in 1989 and has an active role as president and CEO of the company. Meditech International is a Company dedicated to utilizing Low Intensity Laser Therapy to resolve many standard, complex and challenging diseases. As a result of this therapeutic process, many pathologies are effectively resolved, eliminating pain and other symptoms. The company has developed the BioFlex® Series of Laser Therapy Systems as a clinically proven, non-invasive and safe alternative to many traditional therapies. Moreover, the technology consistently produces optimal patient outcomes.

Products are designed for both healthcare professionals and patients at home or while traveling. In addition, Meditech International operates two clinics in the Greater Toronto Area to treat patients with an extensive number of clinical problems on a daily basis. The Company sells its BioFlex® Professional devices to many practitioners, including chiropractors, physicians, physiotherapists, naturopaths, osteopaths, RMTs, dentists and veterinarians.  Personal Systems are sold to a growing number of patients who are unable to obtain professional care on a regular basis.

Dr. Kahn leads a team consisting of basic researchers, clinicians, and a variety of engineering disciplines to design and manufacture devices and develop both standard and customized protocols to treat musculoskeletal disorders, including arthritis, sports injuries, spinal problems, trauma, wounds, vascular problems, etc.

He has worked with clinicians and engineers to develop standard protocols to treat musculoskeletal disorders including arthritis, herniated disc, wounds, TMJ, shoulder tendinopathies, elbow tendinopathies, neck pain and back pain. The technology is highly effective in many instances where conventional therapies do not provide resolution of the existing disease process and the accompanying symptom complex.

References 

Living people
1929 births
American vascular surgeons
Academic staff of the University of Toronto